Himbleton is a village in Worcestershire, England. There is an Anglican church, dedicated to Saint Mary Magdalene.

Located on Neight Hill in the village is a primary school, Himbleton Church of England Primary School, which was opened in 1873. There is also a pub, The Galton Arms, which has featured several times in the Good Beer Guide.

The local cricket team, Himbleton Cricket Club, play in the Worcestershire County League Division 2. Himbleton has historic significance as one of the villages through which the Catholic anarchists under Guy Fawkes travelled.

See also
 History of Worcestershire

References

External links

 British History
 Roll of Honour

Villages in Worcestershire